Argyria lacteella, the milky urola moth, is a moth in the family Crambidae. It was described by Johan Christian Fabricius in 1794. It is found in North America, from Maryland south to Florida and west to Texas. In the south, the range extends through Costa Rica to Brazil. It is also found on Cuba, Puerto Rico and Bermuda.

Adults are on wing from spring to fall.

References

Argyriini
Moths described in 1794
Moths of North America
Moths of South America